Michael Korkidas (on 12 January 1981) is a former Greece international rugby league footballer who played as a  in the NRL, the Super League and was captain of Greece.

Background
Korkidas was born in Sydney, New South Wales, Australia.

Playing career

Early Career in Australia
While attending Marist College Kogarah, Korkidas played for the Australian Schoolboys team in 1998.

Korkidas made his professional rugby league début for the Sydney Roosters in the NRL in Australia in 2001. He played two seasons at the club. At the end of the 2002 season, he joined up with Super League's Wakefield Trinity Wildcats (Heritage No. 1203).

Super League Career (2003 - 2012)
Korkidas played in the Super League from 2003 until 2012, playing for a number of clubs. These clubs are: Wakefield Trinity Wildcats (2003 – 2006), Salford City Reds (2007 – 2008), Castleford Tigers (Heritage No. 884) (2008), Huddersfield Giants (2009) and returning to the Wakefield Trinity Wildcats in 2009 (until 2011) and finally, the Keighley Cougars (2012 - for one season).

He signed with Huddersfield Giants on a three-year contract from 2009 after negotiating a release from Castleford for his final season. However, in late May 2009,  Korkidas returned to Wakefield mid-season in a deal with both clubs. He remained at the club until the end of the 2011 season.

In October 2011, he joined his old playing colleague Jason Demetriou, at the newly promoted Keighley Cougars for the 2012 season in the Championship. At the end of the season, he retired from the Super league, and returned to Australia. There is no mention of Korkidas returning the NRL at this stage.

Return to Australia (2013 - present)
After his high-profile career in England, Korkidas returned to Australia in 2013 to ease off his playing career. He joined the Dapto Canaries club in 2013, a team that are playing in the Illawarra Rugby League competition. Korkidas finished his rugby league career with the club at the end of the 2014 season.

He also played for the Illawarra Cutters club in their final two games of the 2013 season. They participate in the NSW Cup, the NRL's NSW feeder competition for the St George Illawarra Dragons.

Representative career
Korkidas captained Greece in the team's first official international match in 2013, a 90–0 win over Hungary.

Korkidas captained Greece for Thailand's Chang 13 first international match at King Mongkut's Institute of Technology, Ladkrabang, Bangkok, Thailand; Greece beat Thailand 90–0, 24-0 half time winning the Eurasia cup on October 12, 2013, although this was not a test-match.

References

External links
Michael Korkidas Statistics at rugbyleagueproject.org

1981 births
Living people
Australian people of Greek descent
Australian rugby league players
Australian expatriate sportspeople in England
Castleford Tigers players
Greece national rugby league team captains
Greece national rugby league team players
Greek expatriate sportspeople in England
Huddersfield Giants players
Keighley Cougars players
Rugby league players from Sydney
Rugby league props
Salford Red Devils players
Sydney Roosters players
Wakefield Trinity players